Mazmanyan (in Armenian Մազմանյան) is an Armenian surname. Its variant in Western Armenian is Մազմանեան or Mazmanian.

Mazmanyan / Mazmanian may refer to

Armen Mazmanyan (1960–2014), Armenian theater director and actor and rector of the Yerevan State Institute of Theater and Cinema
Art Mazmanian, (born 1927), American baseball coach and manager
Big John Mazmanian (1926–2006), American NHRA drag racer.
Yertward Mazamanian or Mazmanian (1924–2010), widely known as "Eight Finger Eddie", American hippie of Armenian descent, who was credited with popularizing Goa, India as a tourist destination from the mid-1960s onward 

Armenian-language surnames